Anastasia Viktorevna Poltoratskaya (Russian: Анастасия Викторевна Полторацкая, born 4 April 1988) is a Russian former professional tennis player.

She won six doubles titles and reached five singles finals at tournaments on the ITF Circuit. On 6 July 2009, she achieved her best singles ranking of world No. 277. On 17 August 2009, she peaked at No. 145 in the WTA doubles rankings.

Personal life
Poltoratskaya is the only child of Viktor and Tatiana, and resides in her hometown Ekaterinburg.

ITF Circuit finals

Singles: 5 (0–5)

Doubles: 18 (6–12)

References

External links
 
 

1988 births
Living people
Sportspeople from Yekaterinburg
Russian female tennis players
21st-century Russian women
20th-century Russian women